This is a list of United Church of Canada churches in Toronto, Ontario. In its early history, the city was an overwhelmingly Protestant community, and was a centre of Methodism. The Presbyterian Church also had a very strong presence. When the two denominations merged, Toronto was at the forefront of the formation of what became the United Church. The first council of the new church was held at Metropolitan United Church, still one of the city's most prominent. The later years of the 20th century saw a decline in the United Church in central Toronto, as followers of many new faiths moved in, forcing many of the downtown congregations to consolidate. At the same time the rise of the suburbs led to a new era of church building in the 1950s and 1960s. Today there are just under a hundred United Church churches in Toronto, but this number is steadily falling as congregations consolidate.

The Toronto Conference is one of the 13 conferences that the United Church is divided into. This conference covers much of south central Ontario, including all of the city of Toronto as well as the surrounding counties. The city itself is divided into two presbyteries: 
Toronto Southeast, covering eastern North York, East York, the old city of Scarborough, Ontario and eastern areas of the old city of Toronto;
South West, covering Etobicoke, York, the western parts of North York and old Toronto.  South West also extends into Malton, Brampton and Halton Hills.

See also
List of Anglican churches in Toronto
List of Orthodox churches in Toronto
List of Presbyterian churches in Toronto
List of Roman Catholic churches in Toronto
List of Synagogues in Toronto

References
Toronto Conference - List of Presbyteries

 
Churches, United Church of Canada
Toronto, United Church of Canada
Christianity in Ontario